Dimitrios Sisinis was a  Hellenic Army general.

Born in Gastouni in 1861, he studied at the Hellenic Army Academy, graduating in 1884 as an Artillery Second Lieutenant. He fought in the Greco-Turkish War of 1897, and the Balkan Wars of 1912–13. In 1917 he was dismissed from the Army as a royalist during the National Schism, being re-instated in 1920 with the anti-Venizelist electoral victory. He finally retired from service on 12 October 1921 (O.S.) with the rank of Major General.

References

1861 births
20th-century deaths
People from Gastouni
Hellenic Army major generals
Greek military personnel of the Balkan Wars
Greek military personnel of the Greco-Turkish War (1897)
Dimitrios